The Dessau Zoo is a municipally owned zoo in Dessau, Saxony-Anhalt, Germany which was founded in 1958. It is located in a park that surrounds the former mausoleum of the Dukes of Anhalt.

About 500 animals from 120 species are visited by around 100,000 guests per year.

Most of the animals are of European origin, like wolves, goats and donkeys but the zoo also shows exotic species like kangaroos, llamas and jaguars.

In the terrarium lives europes oldest reticulated python, almost 7 meters long.

See also 
 List of zoos in Germany

References

External links 
  

Zoos in Germany
Zoos established in 1958
Zoological Garden
Zoological Garden